Zebrzydowice may refer to the following places in southern Poland:
Zebrzydowice, Lesser Poland Voivodeship (south-west Poland)
Zebrzydowice, Silesian Voivodeship (south Poland)
Zebrzydowice, Rybnik in Silesian Voivodeship (south Poland)